Syncopacma syncrita is a moth of the family Gelechiidae. It was described by Edward Meyrick in 1926. It is found in Asia Minor and India.

References

Moths described in 1926
Syncopacma